Darreh Chenari-ye Kareyak (also Romanized as Darreh Chenārī-ye Kareyak) is a village in Dana Rural District, in the Central District of Dana County, Kohgiluyeh and Boyer-Ahmad Province, Iran. At the 2006 census, its population was 37, in 9 families.

References 

Populated places in Dana County